The 2013 MercedesCup was a men's tennis tournament played on outdoor clay courts. It was the 36th edition of the Stuttgart Open, and was part of the ATP World Tour 250 series of the 2013 ATP World Tour. It was held at the Tennis Club Weissenhof in Stuttgart, Germany, from 6 July until 14 July 2013. Fabio Fognini won the singles title.

Singles main draw entrants

Seeds 

 1 Rankings are as of June 24, 2013

Other entrants 
The following players received wildcards into the singles main draw:
  Michael Berrer
  Robin Kern
  Florian Mayer

The following players received entry from the qualifying draw:
  Andreas Beck
  Nils Langer
  Daniel Muñoz de la Nava
  Alexander Ward

Withdrawals 
Before the tournament
  Pablo Cuevas
  Grega Žemlja

Retirements
  Michael Berrer (left elbow injury)

Doubles main draw entrants

Seeds 

 Rankings are as of June 24, 2013

Other entrants 
The following pairs received wildcards into the doubles main draw:
  Andreas Beck /  Michael Berrer
  Tommy Haas /  Robin Kern

Withdrawals
During the tournament
  Michael Berrer (left elbow injury)

Finals

Singles 

  Fabio Fognini defeated  Philipp Kohlschreiber, 5–7, 6–4, 6–4

Doubles 

  Facundo Bagnis /  Thomaz Bellucci defeated  Tomasz Bednarek /  Mateusz Kowalczyk, 2–6, 6–4, [11–9]

References

External links 
 Official website 
 ATP tournament profile

Stuttgart Open
Stuttgart Open
Stutt